Baatarzorigiin Battsetseg is a Mongolian wrestler who participated at the 2010 Summer Youth Olympics in Singapore. She won the gold medal in the girls' freestyle 60 kg event, defeating Pooja Dhanda of India in the final.

References 

Wrestlers at the 2010 Summer Youth Olympics
Mongolian wrestlers
Living people
Year of birth missing (living people)
Youth Olympic gold medalists for Mongolia